Tibor Kun Bálint (born 12 June 1972) is a Hungarian short track speed skater. He competed in the men's 1000 metres event at the 1992 Winter Olympics.

References

1972 births
Living people
Hungarian male short track speed skaters
Olympic short track speed skaters of Hungary
Short track speed skaters at the 1992 Winter Olympics
Speed skaters from Budapest